The Ukinrek Maars are two volcanic craters on the north side of the Aleutian Range in Alaska that were formed by a phreatomagmatic eruption in 1977. The maars are 1.5 km south of Becharof Lake and 12 km northwest of Peulik Volcano, on a low area of the range, bordering the Bering Sea. The western of the two is elliptical in shape and up to 170 m in diameter and 35 m deep. The other lies 600 m to the east and is circular and up to 300 m in diameter and 70 m deep. The east maar has a 49 m-high lava dome within its crater lake.

The eruption occurred in March–April 1977 and lasted for ten days. There was no previous eruption. The magmatic material was olivine basalt from a mantle source. Pyroclastic surge from the eruptions traveled to the northwest. The volume of lava erupted was 9×105 m3 and the volume of tephra expelled was 2.6×107 m3.

The Quaternary age Gas Rocks dacite domes some three km to the northeast were the site of a phreatic eruption some 2300 years ago.

References

External links
 Volcanoes of the Alaska Peninsula and Aleutian Islands-Selected Photographs
 Alaska Volcano Observatory

March 1977 events in the United States
April 1977 events in the United States
Active volcanoes
Maars of Alaska
Volcanic crater lakes
Landforms of Lake and Peninsula Borough, Alaska
Aleutian Range